Péter Tóvári (born 31 October 1951) is a Hungarian rower. He competed in the men's eight event at the 1980 Summer Olympics.

References

1951 births
Living people
Hungarian male rowers
Olympic rowers of Hungary
Rowers at the 1980 Summer Olympics
Sportspeople from Győr